Alberto Undurraga Vicuña (born 17 June 1969) is a Chilean politician and economist.

External Links
Biblioteca Nacional Profile

Living people
1969 births
20th-century Chilean economists
Pontifical Catholic University of Chile alumni
Christian Democratic Party (Chile) politicians
Mayors of places in Chile
Chilean Ministers of Public Works
People from Santiago
21st-century Chilean economists